Stokstad is a Norwegian surname. Notable people with the surname include:

Bjørn Stokstad
Marilyn Stokstad (1929–2016), American art historian
Ove Stokstad (1939–2018), Norwegian printmaker and jazz musician
Trygve Stokstad (1902–1979), Norwegian boxer

Norwegian-language surnames